Jackson North is a rural locality in the Maranoa Region, Queensland, Australia. In the  Jackson North had a population of 61 people.

History 
The locality takes its name from the town of Jackson to the south, which was named after John Woodward Wyndham Jackson who was a pioneer settler in the district.

Noonga Provisional School opened in 1916, as a half-time school in conjunction with Clarke's Creek Provisional School (meaning the two schools shared on teacher between them). The school closed in 1917, but reopened in 1918 as a half-time school in conjunction with Bogandilla Provisional School. In 1919 it was briefly a full-time school (not sharing its teacher) before reverting to a half-time school in conjunction with Noonga Creek Provisional School in August 1920. The school closed circa 1921. On 22 September 1947 a new Noonga State School opened. It closed at end of the school year in 1968. Noonga State School was located on the Noonga pastoral station west of the Jackson Wandoan Road and immediately west of Noonga Creek.

In the  Jackson North had a population of 61 people.

Road infrastructure
The Warrego Highway runs along the southern boundary.

References 

Maranoa Region
Localities in Queensland